Hagan-Stone Park is a  wildlife refuge and family campground owned and operated by Guilford County, North Carolina located on Hagan Stone Park Road off U.S. Highway 421. It is open daily 8 am to sunset, weather permitting.

The park has several lakes, camp shelters with charcoal grills, and playgrounds. The park is the home of the Greensboro Invitational Cross Country Meet hosted annually in September by the Greensboro Pacesetters for high school and college athletes.

Notes

External links 
 http://www.guilfordcountync.gov/our-county/county-parks/hagan-stone-park

Parks in North Carolina
Geography of Greensboro, North Carolina
Protected areas of Guilford County, North Carolina
Tourist attractions in Greensboro, North Carolina